= Léon Fairmaire =

French entomologist

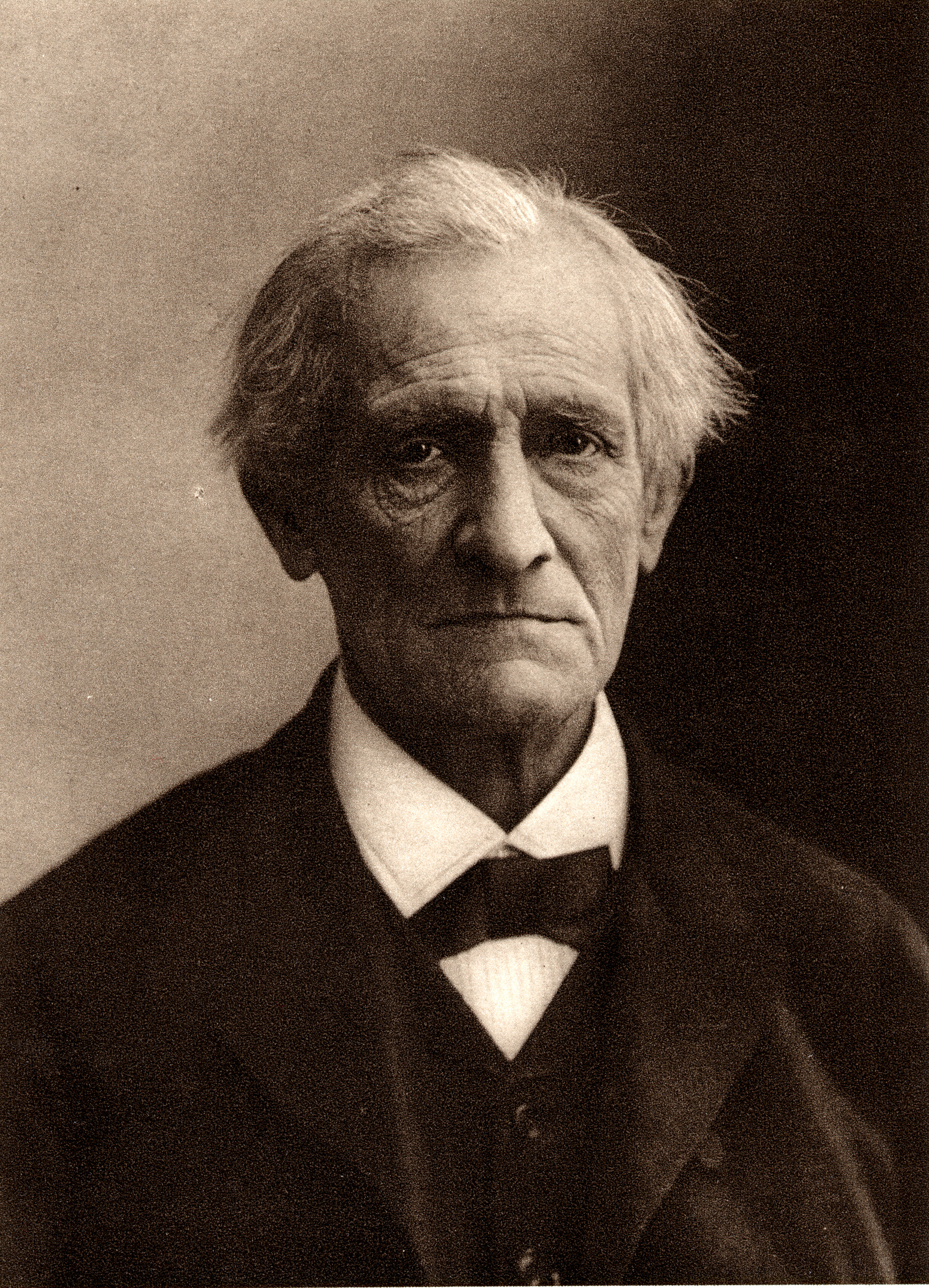
Léon Fairmaire.

Léon Marc Herminie Fairmaire (29 June 1820 – 1 April 1906) was a French entomologist.

As a specialist in Coleoptera, he assembled an immense collection comparable with that of Pierre François Marie Auguste Dejean (1780–1845). This is in the Muséum national d'histoire naturelle. Fairmaire wrote 450 scientific papers and other publications relating to Coleoptera (partial list of papers in Wikispecies). He also worked on Hemiptera.

== See also ==
- Category:Taxa named by Léon Fairmaire
